The 2007 Australian GT Championship was a CAMS sanctioned Australian motor racing championship open to closed production based sports cars as approved for FIA GT3 competition and to similar cars as approved by CAMS. The championship began on 3 February 2007 at Eastern Creek Raceway and ended on 9 December at Sandown Raceway after eight rounds held across five states. It was the eleventh Australian GT Championship.

The championship was won by Danish driver Allan Simonsen who drove a Ferrari 360 GT owned by Ted Huglin in the first four rounds and a Ferrari F430, newly imported by Mark Coffey Racing, in the last four rounds.

Teams and drivers
The following drivers competed in the 2007 Australian GT Championship.

Calendar

Allan Simonsen and Tim Leahey were awarded the 2007 Australian Tourist Trophy for their victory in the Sandown GT Classic.

Points system
For Rounds 1, 2, 4, 5, 6 and 7, points were awarded on a 38-32-28-25-23-21-19-18-17-16-15-14-13-12-11-10-9-8-7-6-5-4-3-2-1 basis for the top 25 positions in each of the three races.
Round 3 featured only two races and points were allocated on a 57-48-42-37.5-34.5-31.5-28.5-27-25.5-24-22.5-21-19.5-18-16.5-15-13.5-12-10.5-9-7.5-6-4.5-3-1.5 basis.
Round 8 was a 500 kilometre endurance round and points were allocated on a 114-96-84-75-69-63-57-54-51-48-45-42-39-36-33-30-27-24-21-18-15-12-9-6-3 basis.
Three bonus points were allocated for pole position at each of the eight rounds.

The total for each driver was adjusted by deducting the worst round point score of those rounds which were contested. This resulted in drivers scoring zero nett points if they only contested only one round.

Championship results

References

External links
 Official series website
 2007 Racing Results Archive at www.natsoft.com.au 
 Images from the Eastern Creek round at www.flickr.com

Australian GT Championship
GT Championship